Pompeii is a 2014 epic romantic historical disaster film produced and directed by Paul W. S. Anderson. An international co-production between the United States, Germany and Canada, it is inspired by and based on the eruption of Mount Vesuvius in 79 A.D. that destroyed Pompeii, a city of the Roman Empire. The film stars Kit Harington, Emily Browning, Carrie-Anne Moss, Adewale Akinnuoye-Agbaje, Jessica Lucas, with Jared Harris and Kiefer Sutherland.

Pompeii premiered in France, Belgium, and Russia on February 19, 2014, and was released over the course of the next day in Argentina, Greece, Hungary, Italy and later in the United States and Canada on February 21, 2014.

This is FilmDistrict's last film before it merged with Focus Features.

Plot

In northern Britannia, 62 AD, a tribe of Celtic horsemen is brutally wiped out by Romans led by Corvus. The only survivor, a boy named Milo, whose parents Corvus personally killed, is captured by slave traders.

Seventeen years later, in Londinium in 79 A.D., slave owner Graecus watches a class of gladiators battle, unimpressed until he sees the grown Milo, a talented gladiator the crowds call "the Celt". Milo is soon brought to Pompeii with his fellow slaves. On the road, they see a horse fall while drawing a carriage carrying Cassia, returning after a year in Rome, and her servant Ariadne. Milo kills the horse to end its suffering, and Cassia is drawn to him. Cassia is the daughter of the city governor Severus and his wife Aurelia. Severus is hoping to have the new Emperor Titus invest in plans to rebuild Pompeii, despite Cassia's warning of Rome becoming more corrupt. Felix, a servant, takes Cassia’s horse Vires for a ride only to be swallowed up when a quake from Mount Vesuvius opens up the ground under him.

In Pompeii, Milo develops a rivalry with Atticus, a champion gladiator who, by Roman law, will be given his freedom after he earns one more victory. The gladiators are shown off at a party where Corvus, now a Senator, tells Severus the Emperor will not invest in his plans but he himself will. It is revealed Cassia left Rome to escape Corvus’s advances. When an earthquake causes some horses to become anxious, Milo helps calm one down. He then takes Cassia on a ride and tells her they cannot be together. Returning to the villa, Corvus is ready to kill Milo (not recognizing him from the village massacre), but Cassia pleads for Milo's life. Milo is lashed for his actions, and Atticus admits respect for his rival as they prepare to face each other at the upcoming festival.

In the Amphitheatre of Pompeii, to punish Milo, Corvus orders him killed in the first battle, and wicked trainer Bellator convinces Graecus to sacrifice Atticus, as well. The two men, and other gladiators, are chained to rocks as other gladiators come out as Roman soldiers, to recreate Corvus’ victory over the Celts. Working together, Milo and Atticus survive the battle; Atticus realizes the Romans will never honor his freedom. During the battle, Corvus forces Cassia to agree to marry him by threatening to have her family killed for supposed treason against the Emperor. When Milo and Atticus win, Cassia defies Corvus by holding a “thumbs-up” for them to live, and Corvus has her taken to the villa to be locked up. Claiming an earthquake is a sign from Vulcan, Corvus has his officer Proculus fight Milo one-on-one. Their battle is interrupted when Mount Vesuvius erupts, creating massive tremors that cause the arena to collapse, sending Milo and Proculus crashing to the dungeons. Milo opens up the gates to allow his fellow gladiators a chance to attack; Proculus escapes, while the gladiators kill Bellator. Seeing Corvus fallen under a collapsed beam, Severus tries to kill him, but Corvus stabs him instead and escapes.

The eruption sends flaming debris raining down upon the city as the populace tries to flee to the harbor. One fireball destroys and sinks a ship, killing the escaping Graecus. Before dying, Aurelia tells Milo that Cassia is at the villa. Milo races to the villa and manages to save Cassia, but Ariadne is killed when the villa collapses into the Mediterranean Sea. Atticus tries to reach the harbor, but a tsunami created by the volcano smashes into the city, destroying the harbour and the outer walls, and smashing several ships. Reuniting with Atticus, Milo suggests searching the arena for horses to escape. As the gladiators face Roman soldiers at the arena, Cassia is abducted by Corvus after finding her parents' bodies. Atticus has Milo chase after the chariot carrying the two while he fights Proculus. Atticus is mortally wounded in the duel, but nonetheless manages to kill Proculus.

Milo chases Corvus across the city; both barely avoid fireballs, and collapsing infrastructure. Cassia manages to free herself before the chariot crashes into the Temple of Apollo. Milo and Corvus duel as a fireball destroys the temple. Cassia chains Corvus to a building, as Milo declares who he is, that Corvus killed his family and now his gods are coming to punish the Senator. Milo and Cassia ride off as a pyroclastic surge races into the city, incinerating Corvus. At the arena, Atticus proudly proclaims that he dies a free man before being consumed by the pyroclastic flow. At the city outskirts, the horse throws off Milo and Cassia. Milo tells Cassia to leave him, realising the horse isn't fast enough to carry them both. Instead, she sends the horse off, not wanting to spend her last moments running, and knowing they cannot outrun the surge. Milo kisses Cassia as the surge engulfs them. The last shot is of the duo's petrified bodies, locked in an eternal embrace.

Cast
 Kit Harington as Milo, a gladiator
 Dylan Schombing as young Milo
 Emily Browning as Cassia, daughter to Severus and Aurelia
 Kiefer Sutherland as Senator Quintus Attius Corvus
 Carrie-Anne Moss as Aurelia, wife to Severus
 Jared Harris as Severus, the city governor of Pompeii
 Adewale Akinnuoye-Agbaje as Atticus, a gladiator
 Jessica Lucas as Ariadne, a servant to Cassia
 Joe Pingue as Graecus, a slave owner
 Currie Graham as Bellator, a slave trainer
 Sasha Roiz as Marcus Proculus, Corvus's Officer
 Dalmar Abuzeid as Felix, a slave to Severus
 Jean-Francois Lachapelle as Milo's Father
 Rebecca Eady as Milo's Mother
 Jean Frenette as Boss Slaver
 Maxime Savaria as Biggest Thracian
 Ron Kennell as The Weasel
 Tom Bishop Jr. as Cassia's Carriage Driver
 Emmanuel Kabongo as African Gladiator
 Brock Johnson as Flashback Centurion
 Kristina Nicoll as Rich Wife #1
 Janine Theriault as Rich Wife #2
 Mark Whelan as Ship's Captain
 Anais Frenette as Harbour Child
 Donna Christo as Harbour Mother
 Thomas Stumpo as Harbour Boy

Production
The film was shot in Toronto, Ontario, from March to July 2013, primarily at Cinespace Film Studios' Kipling Avenue facility. Constantin Film and Don Carmody Productions formerly selected Cinespace as a shooting locale for Resident Evil: Retribution and The Mortal Instruments: City of Bones.

Leading man Kit Harington underwent a gruelling training regimen for the film in order to bulk up for the role. Harington stated he had "wanted to do a body transformation for something—it was one of those processes that I had never really done before ... I became obsessed with it. To the point where I was going to the gym three times a day for six days a week. I was becoming exhausted. So the trainer stepped in and said, 'Look, you don't need to go through all of this. This is body dysmorphia now."

Pompeii was the fourth time that director Anderson used 3D cameras in his films, the first being Resident Evil: Afterlife in 2010. Resident Evil producers Jeremy Bolt and Don Carmody reunited with Anderson for the film. FilmDistrict bought the distribution rights in the US, and because of Sony's relationship with the filmmakers, they chose to release the film with TriStar Pictures. Summit Entertainment, who released Anderson's The Three Musketeers, handled distribution sales outside of Germany and the US (through Lionsgate).

Release

Box office
Pompeii grossed $10 million in its opening weekend, finishing in third, against strong competition from The Lego Movie. As of June 30, 2014, the film has grossed $23.2 million in North America and $78.6 million in other territories for a worldwide total of $117.8 million.

The film won the Academy of Canadian Cinema and Television's Golden Screen Award for 2014 as the year's top-grossing Canadian film.

Critical response
Review aggregation website Rotten Tomatoes gives the film a 27% score based on 170 reviews, with an average rating of 4.40/10. The site's consensus reads: "This big-budget sword-and-sandal adventure lacks the energy and storytelling heft to amount to more than a guilty pleasure." On Metacritic, the film has an aggregate score of 39 out of 100 based on 33 critics, indicating "generally unfavorable reviews". Audiences polled by the market research firm CinemaScore gave an average grade of "B" on an A+ to F scale.

Some critics were rather favorable, as shown by Vulture's review, which summarized the film as not a particularly original story, but it gallops along at a nice clip, with the good guys appropriately gallant and breathless and the bad guys appropriately smug and snarly ... And whether it's elaborate gladiatorial battles or a chariot chase through a burning city, Anderson directs with precision, rhythm, and ruthlessness – he has an eye and an ear for violence, for the visceral impact of a kill. At his best, he creates action sequences in which you feel anything might happen, even though you usually know how they'll turn out. And the ones in Pompeii are more engaging than those of any superhero movie I saw last year ... Meanwhile, the disaster renders the villains even pettier, and the devoted lovers even more romantic. That is all as it should be. From Bulwer-Lytton to Leone, the Pompeii story has never not been schlock: It ain't the Bible, and it ain't Homer. In this gorgeous, silly, exciting new version, it finds its level. Pompeii 3-D wants merely to entertain. And it does, proudly.

Harington later joked about the film's reception on Saturday Night Live, remarking that the movie was "more of a disaster than the event it was based on."

Accolades

Historical accuracy
The film relies for its reconstruction of historical events on two letters from Pliny the Younger to the Roman historian Tacitus. It opens with the quotation from Pliny:You could hear the shrieks of women, the wailing of infants, and the shouting of men; some were calling their parents, others their children or their wives, trying to recognize them by their voices. People bewailed their own fate or that of their relatives, and there were some who prayed for death in their terror of dying. Many besought the aid of the gods, but still more imagined there were no gods left, and that the universe was plunged into eternal darkness for evermore. Anderson became enamored of his writings, particularly their near fantastical element and their eloquence, whose influence can be seen throughout the film in the destruction of Pompeii.

The depiction of the eruption is based on eruptions which occurred all over the world over the last ten years. Anderson cites the volcanic eruption of Mount Etna in Italy and various eruptions of Japanese volcanoes as specific examples of volcanic eruptions which the production crew observed through footage which has been captured on film. Furthermore, Anderson wanted to portray the lightning which is often seen in the ash cloud above eruptions, as he had never seen it portrayed before, and he felt it was both magnificent and very terrifying. The animation team was so concerned with realism in the eruption that they would always have real photographs and footage of real eruptions visible to them on separate screens as they put together the eruption of Mount Vesuvius for the film. Rosaly Lopes, a volcanologist at NASA's Jet Propulsion Laboratory in Pasadena, California, supported Anderson's work, stating that the film "realistically captured the earthquakes that preceded the eruption, the explosions and the pyroclastic flows of hot ash and gas that buried the city and its residents."

The depiction of the city was based on the surviving ruins of Pompeii. To ensure complete accuracy, any shots of the ancient city were built upon existing footage of the ruins. Anderson states,we would do a real helicopter shot over the ruins of the city so that we knew we were getting the layout of the city correct ... Then we would project a computer-generated image over the top of the real photography ... That is how we got the architecture of the city precise. Sarah Yeomans, an archaeologist at USC, has praised the attention to detail in the film's depiction of Pompeii, noting, for example, the raised paving stones in the streets, the political graffiti on the buildings, and the amphitheatre where gladiatorial combat takes place.

Anderson has described other aspects of the film as being less rigorously historical. For example, he states that the timeframe of the events was compacted in order to keep the intensity levels high. His portrayal of some aspects of the eruption, in particular the inclusion of fireballs raining from the sky, were included for dramatic effect rather than historical accuracy. He also received minor criticism from Yeomans for his portrayal of women, who would not have been seen alone in town, involved in political affairs, nor wearing the revealing clothes they wore in the film. Anderson portrayed these women more according to modern tastes. The characters themselves are fictional. Anderson found inspiration for them in real people, representing the famous plaster cast of the "twin lovers" of Pompeii as Milo and Cassia, and finding inspiration for Atticus in the casts of the cowering man. Anderson said he received approval from every volcanologist and historian he has shown the movie to, having received "high marks for both scientific and historical accuracy", which is what the team was striving for.

References

External links

 
 
 
 
 
 

2014 films
2014 3D films
2014 action films
2010s action adventure films
2010s disaster films
Adventure films based on actual events
American 3D films
American action adventure films
Canadian 3D films
Canadian action adventure films
Canadian disaster films
German 3D films
German action adventure films
Disaster action films
2010s English-language films
English-language Canadian films
English-language German films
Films about death
Films about earthquakes
Films about gladiatorial combat
Films about interclass romance
Films about slavery
Films about tsunamis
Films about volcanoes
Films directed by Paul W. S. Anderson
Films produced by Paul W. S. Anderson
Films produced by Don Carmody
Films scored by Clinton Shorter
Films set in 79 AD
Films set in the Roman Empire
Films set in London
Films set in ancient Rome
Films set in Campania
Films shot in Toronto
Pompeii in popular culture
Entertainment One films
Constantin Film films
FilmDistrict films
Summit Entertainment films
TriStar Pictures films
Lionsgate films
2010s American films
2010s Canadian films
2010s German films